Alethic modality (from Greek ἀλήθεια = truth) is a linguistic modality that indicates modalities of truth, in particular the modalities of logical necessity, contingency, possibility and impossibility.

Alethic modality is often associated with epistemic modality in research, and it has been questioned whether this modality should be considered distinct from epistemic modality which denotes the speaker's evaluation or judgment of the truth. The criticism states that there is no real difference between "the truth in the world" (alethic) and "the truth in an individual's mind" (epistemic). An investigation has not found a single language in which alethic and epistemic modalities would be formally distinguished, for example by the means of a grammatical mood.  In such a language, "A circle can't be square", "can't be" would be expressed by an alethic mood, whereas for "He can't be that wealthy", "can't be" would be expressed by an epistemic mood. As we can see, this is not a distinction drawn in English grammar.

"You can't give these plants too much water." is a well-known play on the distinction between perhaps alethic and hortatory or injunctive modalities (it can mean either "it is impossible to give these plants too much water = giving them too much water is harmless" or "you must not give these plants too much water = giving them too much water is harmful"). The dilemma is fairly easily resolved when listening through paralinguistic cues and particularly suprasegmental cues (intonation).  So while there may not be a morphologically based alethic mood, this does not seem to preclude the usefulness of distinguishing between these two types of modes.  Alethic modality might then concern what are considered to be apodictic statements.

References

Grammatical moods
Modal logic
Linguistic modality
Semantics